The Federal Counterintelligence Service of the Russian Federation (FSK RF) was the main security agency of Russia. The FSK was the main successor agency to the Soviet Union's KGB. It existed from 1993 to 1995, when it was reorganized into the Federal Security Service (FSB).

Origin
On November 26, 1991, the President of the RSFSR Boris Yeltsin issued a decree on the transformation of the republican State Security Committee (KGB) into the Federal Security Agency of the RSFSR (AFB). On January 24, 1992, by decree of the President of Russia, the Ministry of Security of the Russian Federation was created on the basis of the abolished Federal Security Agency of the RSFSR and the Inter-Republican Security Service of the USSR.

On December 21, 1993, by decree of the President of the Russian Federation, the Ministry of Security was abolished and the Federal Counterintelligence Service of the Russian Federation (FSK) was created in its place.

Directors of the AFB / Ministers of security / Directors of the FSK
 Viktor Ivanenko (November 1991 – January 1992)
 Viktor Barannikov (January 1992 – July 1993)
 Nikolai Golushko (July 1993 – February 1994)
 Sergei Stepashin (February 1994 – April 1995)

Restructuring into FSB
The FSK was renamed the FSB (Federal'naya Sluzhba Bezopasnosti Rossiyskoi Federatsii (Федера́льная слу́жба безопа́сности Росси́йской Федера́ции) Federal Security Service of the Russian Federation) by the Federal Law of April 3, 1995, "On the Organs of the Federal Security Service in the Russian Federation" and the Decree of the President of the Russian Federation of June 23, 1995, making the new FSB a more powerful organization.

References

External links
 Federal Counterintelligence Service (FSK)
 Historical background on the FSB website

1993 establishments in Russia
Defunct law enforcement agencies of Russia
Government of Russia
Russian intelligence agencies